Martin Heinrich Gustav Schwantes (18 September 1881 – 1960) was a German archaeologist and botanist specialist of Aizoaceae (Mesembryanthemaceae).

Life and work
Schwantes was born in Bleckede and died in Hamburg. 

The Duvensee paddle is the preserved part of a Mesolithic spade paddle, which was found during archaeological excavations of a Mesolithic dwelling area at Duvensee near Klinkrade (Herzogtum Lauenburg) Schleswig-Holstein, Germany, in 1926 by Schwantes.

Publications
 Deutschlands Urgeschichte (1908)
 "Die Gräber der ältesten Eisenzeit im östlichen Hannover", in: Prähistorische Zeitschrift, vol. 1 (1909), p. 140-162
 Die Bedeutung der Lyngby-Zivilisation für die Gliederung der Steinzeit (Hamburg, 1923)
 Führer durch Haithabu (1932)
 Zur Geschichte der nordischen Zivilisation (Hamburg: Evert, 1938)
 Die Geschichte Schleswig-Holsteins, vol. 1, Vorgeschichte Schleswig-Holsteins (1939)
 Geschichte Schleswig-Holsteins. Die Urgeschichte, vol. 1, part 1 (Neumünster, 1958)
 The Cultivation of the Mesembryanthemaceae (1953)
 Flowering Stones and Mid-Day Flowers (1957)

Tributes
The genus name Schwantesia is in honour of Gustav Schwantes. Astridia is a genus of plant named after Schwantes' wife, Astrid. Lithops schwantesii is a species name given as another tribute.

References

External links

1881 births
1960 deaths
Archaeologists from Lower Saxony
20th-century German botanists
People from Bleckede